Pedro Castro Eiroa (born 15 November 1947) is a Venezuelan footballer. He played in seven matches for the Venezuela national football team from 1975 to 1981. He was also part of Venezuela's squad for the 1975 Copa América tournament.

References

External links
 

1947 births
Living people
Venezuelan footballers
Venezuela international footballers
Footballers from A Coruña
Association football defenders